Hockley Tunnels are two tunnels used by the railway and tram in Hockley, Birmingham, England.

History

The tunnels were built by the Great Western Railway on the line between Snow Hill station in Birmingham and Wolverhampton Low Level station in Wolverhampton, and were two of the three tunnels on that route, the other being Black Lake Tunnel. The Snow Hill to Wolverhampton line was opened on 14 November 1854.

At first, the tunnels carried two mixed-gauge tracks. In 1908-9 they were widened and two additional tracks were laid parallel to and south of the original lines and were designated as "relief", the original tracks becoming the "main" lines.

The tunnels became disused with the closure of Snow Hill station in March 1972.

Present

On 24 September 1995, services north to Smethwick and onwards to Worcester were resumed. The first day also saw steam-hauled special trains, to Stourbridge Junction.

In 1999 the line to Wolverhampton was re-opened as a light-rail (tram) line, the Midland Metro, with the addition of overhead electrification. There are tram stops at either end of the pair of tunnels, Jewellery Quarter to the north, and St Paul's to the south.

The north, Metro side of the tunnels is illuminated, to enable tram drivers to see the track ahead. The Midland Metro stops at tram stops built over former railway stations. Soho & Winson Green railway station is now Soho (Benson Road) and Handsworth & Smethwick railway station is Handsworth (Booth St) while The Hawthorns remains the same name.

References

Coordinates

Tunnels in Birmingham, West Midlands
Railway tunnels in England